Sea Dragon is a junior wooden roller coaster located at the Columbus Zoo and Aquarium in Powell, Ohio. The ride is in the Rides At Adventure Cove section of the zoo. Built by Philadelphia Toboggan Coasters (PTC) under famed designer John C. Allen, the roller coaster opened in 1956 as Jet Flyer. It was one of three junior wooden coasters that Allen designed shortly after becoming president of PTC in 1954 – the other two were Flyer at Hunt's Pier and Valley Volcano at Angela Park. They were based on earlier designs developed by another legendary coaster architect Herbert Schmeck, who was Allen's mentor. Following the dismantling of the other two coasters in the late 1980s, Sea Dragon became the oldest roller coaster from John Allen to remain in operation.

The coaster has one four-car train. Riders are seated two across with two rows per car, giving the coaster a capacity of 16 riders. Station brakes are manually operated using hand-controlled levers.

Following the closure of Big Dipper in 2007, the Sea Dragon became the oldest operating wooden roller coaster in Ohio.

References

Roller coasters in Ohio
Buildings and structures in Delaware County, Ohio
Roller coasters introduced in 1956